Iohahi:io Akwesasne Education & Training Institute is an Aboriginal-owned and controlled post-secondary institution for the Mohawks of Akwesasne.

Aboriginal institutes partner with colleges and universities to offer students degree programs, apprenticeships, certificate programs and diploma programs. IAAEC was founded to provide greater access to post-secondary education for Aboriginal peoples. IAAEC delivers post-secondary programs approved by the Ministry of Training, Colleges and Universities.

History
Since 1993, Iohahi:io Akwesasne Adult Education Centre has offered college and university programs through agreements with public colleges and universities such as St. Lawrence College.

In 2006, the Iohahi:io Akwesasne Adult Education Centre introduced masonry, carpentry, plumbing, and electrical trades training.

IAAEC Mohawk creation story murals and sculpture
In 2009-11 Tammy King, Natasha Thompson and Inez Cook Patterson, who were students in the two year Fine Arts Diploma course, painted a series of seven murals in the IAAEC entryway depicting the Mohawk Creation story, which is built around the central figure of Sky Woman. Sandra Taylor Hedges, an instructor of painting and drawing at IAAAEC, incorporated a sculpture of Sky Woman into the sky light above the murals in 2011.

On March 21, 2019, the Ahkwesahsne Mohawk Board of Education - Board of Trustees - met and approved a name change from “Iohahi:io Akwesasne Adult Education” to “Iohahi:io Akwesasne Education & Training Institute.

Partnerships

Iohahi:io Akwesasne Education & Training Institute offers programs and courses of study in partnership with all levels of government; commissions; industries; commerce and other education and training institutions.

Programs offered
The Iohahi:io Akwesasne Education & Training Institute is a community-based agency providing adults with tutoring in literacy and basic skills, in a culturally sensitive manner to increase their academic skills for entry into higher level education and/or to obtain employment.  The programs offered include: 
 Academic assessments
 One-to-one tutoring
 Refresher workshops
 Online learning 
 Essential skills and workforce literacy
 Career and/or college preparation sessions
 New computer training for adults with no computer experience
 Networking

University and College
College diploma courses at Iohahi:io include: 
Trades - masonry, carpentry, plumbing, and electrical 
Two-year Fine Arts Diploma course 
Practical Nursing with Aboriginal Communities
Police Foundations
Office Administration
Business 
Community Justice Services
Social Services Worker

Continuing Education
Workshops & Seminars

Secondary School and Homework Support
Homework Support Program

Scholarships & Bursaries
The government of Canada sponsors an Aboriginal Bursaries Search Tool that lists over 680 scholarships, bursaries, and other incentives offered by governments, universities, and industry to support Aboriginal post-secondary participation.

References

External links

1993 establishments in Ontario
Akwesasne
Educational institutions established in 1993
First Nations education
Indigenous universities and colleges in North America
Universities and colleges in Quebec